Lenin Alberto Picota (born July 23, 1966 in Panama) is a former professional baseball pitcher. He played two seasons in the Korea Baseball Organization for the Hanwha Eagles in 2002–2003. During his career, Picota has gone by multiple names, his full name (Lenin) as well as two shortened versions (Len or Leny).

He was signed as a free-agent on December 18, 1983.

Perhaps his best season in the minors was 1986, with the Savannah Cardinals. That year, he went 6–2 with a 2.00 ERA in 85 innings. Although he walked 67 and struck out only 45, the fact that he gave up only 55 hits attributed to his success.

1988 was also a good season for him. With the St. Petersburg Cardinals, he went 11–10 with a 2.89 ERA in 143 innings. He only gave up 130 hits that year, but he only struck out 65 batters. Apparently, he was not a strikeout pitcher.

In 2006 Picota represented Panama in the World Baseball Classic. He has played a lot of international ball, whether it be in Korea, Mexico or Chinese Taipei. He has also played independent baseball with the Nashua Pride.

In 2007, he pitched three innings in the Pan-American Games, striking out two batters and allowing two runs.

Picota was signed by the Montreal Expos at one point in his career after playing foreign ball for seven years. He was released before Opening Day.

Picota was announced as manager for the Saraperos de Saltillo of the Mexican Baseball League for the 2017-18 season.

Notes

External links 

1966 births
2006 World Baseball Classic players
Baseball players at the 1999 Pan American Games
Baseball players at the 2007 Pan American Games
Pan American Games competitors for Panama
Erie Cardinals players
Harrisburg Senators players
Arkansas Travelers players
St. Petersburg Cardinals players
Savannah Cardinals players
Jacksonville Suns players
Calgary Cannons players
Ottawa Lynx players
Panamanian expatriate baseball players in Canada
Panamanian expatriate baseball players in Taiwan
Panamanian expatriate baseball players in South Korea
Hanwha Eagles players
Living people
Mercuries Tigers players
Sinon Bulls players
Taipei Gida players
Mexican League baseball managers
Panamanian expatriate baseball players in the Dominican Republic
Estrellas Orientales players
Panamanian expatriate baseball players in Mexico
Panamanian expatriate baseball players in the United States